Kumudavalli is a Gram panchayat in Palakoderu mandal situated about 1 km away from Bhimavaram City of West Godavari District, Andhra Pradesh, India. Kumudavalli Gram Panchayat is one of the four ISO 9001:2008 certified villages in India. The nearest railway station is at Bhimavaram Junction located at a distance of 3.04 Km from Kumudavalli.

Demographics
According to Indian census, 2001, the demographic details of Kumudavalli village is as follows:
 Total Population: 	4,123 in 1,186 Households
 Male Population: 	2,072 and Female Population: 	2,051
 Children Under 6-years of age: 596 (Boys - 332 and Girls - 	264
 Total Literates: 	2,409

References

Villages in West Godavari district